Arrhythmia is a studio album by American hip hop group Antipop Consortium. It was released on Warp on April 2, 2002. It peaked at number 29 on the UK Independent Albums Chart.

Critical reception

Brad Haywood of Pitchfork gave the album a 7.7 out of 10, saying, "despite its shortcomings, Arrhythmia has plenty of appeal, particularly to the indie crowd, for whom progressivism is a badge of pride." Lisa Hageman of CMJ New Music Report said: "This album has been meticulously crafted down to the tiniest detail, rendering each track its own unique and complete experience."

Chicago Reader placed it at number 7 on the "Best Releases of 2002" list. In 2009, The Skinny included it on the "Warp Essentials" list.

Track listing

Personnel
Credits adapted from liner notes.

Antipop Consortium
 Beans – vocals, production (1, 8, 15), art direction, design
 E. Blaize – vocals, production (1, 3–9, 11, 15), timbales (2), keyboards (14), engineering, mixing, art direction, design
 High Priest – vocals, production (1, 2, 8, 9, 11, 12, 14, 15), art direction, design
 M. Sayyid – vocals, production (1, 3, 5, 8, 10, 13, 15), art direction, design

Additional musicians
 Ernesto Abreau – conga (2)
 Nedelka Prescod – vocals (5)
 Shawn "Keys" Tronchin – strings (5, 14), production (5, 14)
 Michael Figaro – vocals (6)
 Andrew Bartolomeo – vocals (6)
 Aswan – vocals (8)
 Tron Man – vocals (8, 12)
 Leon Gruenbaum – keyboards (14)

Technical personnel
 Ken Heitmuller – mastering
 Ron Croudy – art direction, design
 Chris Davison – photography

Charts

References

External links
 

2002 albums
Antipop Consortium albums
Warp (record label) albums